Marko Pejić (born 24 February 1995 in Zagreb) is a Croatian football player who plays for Lithuanian side FK Kauno Žalgiris.

Club career
Marko passed the football school of GNK Dinamo academy. His first senior club was Italian club A.C. Siena. Season later he returned to Croatia and signed for NK Sesvete. On 26 January 2015 he signed a contract with HNK Hajduk until summer 2018.

In January 2017, Pejić joined Austrian club FK Austria Wien. At the end of 2017, he was relegated to the club's second team which he played for until the summer 2019, where his contract expired. On 3 October 2019, he joined Slovenian club FC Koper on a contract for the rest of the season.

Career statistics

References

External links
 
Marko Pejić at hajduk.hr
 http://hajduk.hr/vijest/predstavljamo-trojicu-novih-mladih-nogometasa-hajduka/5286

1995 births
Living people
Footballers from Zagreb
Association football fullbacks
Association football midfielders
Croatian footballers
Croatia youth international footballers
Croatia under-21 international footballers
NK Sesvete players
HNK Hajduk Split players
HNK Hajduk Split II players
FK Austria Wien players
FC Koper players
FK Kauno Žalgiris players
First Football League (Croatia) players
Croatian Football League players
Austrian Football Bundesliga players
2. Liga (Austria) players
Austrian Regionalliga players
Slovenian Second League players
Slovenian PrvaLiga players
A Lyga players
Croatian expatriate footballers
Expatriate footballers in Austria
Croatian expatriate sportspeople in Austria
Expatriate footballers in Slovenia
Croatian expatriate sportspeople in Slovenia
Expatriate footballers in Lithuania
Croatian expatriate sportspeople in Lithuania